Els Rens (born 19 February 1983) is a Belgian long-distance runner. She finished 84th in the marathon at the 2016 Olympics

References

External links

 

1983 births
Living people
Belgian female long-distance runners
Belgian female marathon runners
Place of birth missing (living people)
Athletes (track and field) at the 2016 Summer Olympics
Olympic athletes of Belgium